The Roman Catholic Church in Nicaragua comprises one ecclesiastical province headed by an archbishop. The province is in turn subdivided into 9 dioceses and 1 archdiocese each headed by a bishop or an archbishop.

List of dioceses

Episcopal Conference of Nicaragua

Ecclesiastical province of Managua 

 Archdiocese of Managua
 Diocese of Bluefields
 Diocese of Estelí
 Diocese of Granada
 Diocese of Jinotega
 Diocese of Juigalpa
 Diocese of León en Nicaragua
 Diocese of Matagalpa
 Diocese of Siuna

References
Catholic-Hierarchy entry.
GCatholic.org.

Nicaragua
Catholic dioceses